Aviation/Century station is an elevated light rail station on the K Line of the Los Angeles Metro Rail system. It is located alongside Aviation Boulevard above its intersection of Century Boulevard, located in the Westchester neighborhood of Los Angeles.

Construction on the station is complete but it is not expected to open until Fall 2023 due to construction of the LAX Automated People Mover and the infill LAX/Metro Transit Center station.

The Century railroad bridge was demolished on July 25, 2014, to make way for the station.

Service

Station layout

Connections 
When the station opens, the following connections are expected to be available:
 Beach Cities Transit: 109
 Big Blue Bus (Santa Monica): 3, Rapid 3
 Culver CityBus: 6
 Los Angeles Metro Bus:

Station artwork (Rise)
The station incorporates artwork by the artist Sherin Guirguis, an Egyptian artist known for her work exploring cultural identity and lost feminist histories. The main component of the Aviation station art is a richly colored artwork for the platform and fence. Filled with countless of beautiful yellow designs and patterns. The artwork reflects the diversity of the surrounding neighborhood and LA County, representing numerous individuals who migrated into the area, many who may faced tremendous challenges. The bright color of the piece makes it very conspicuous for drivers passing underneath the station.

References 

Future Los Angeles Metro Rail stations
K Line (Los Angeles Metro)
C Line (Los Angeles Metro)
Railway stations scheduled to open in 2023
Westchester, Los Angeles